The EuroLeague Finals Top Scorer is the individual award for the player that gained the highest points in the EuroLeague Finals, the championship finals of the European-wide top-tier level professional club basketball competition, the EuroLeague.

EuroLeague Finals Top Scorers

From the 1958 season, to the present, the Top Scorer of the EuroLeague Finals is noted, regardless of whether he played on the winning or losing team.

Player nationality by national team:

* The 2000–01 season was a transition year, with the best European teams splitting into two different major leagues: The SuproLeague, held by FIBA Europe, and the EuroLeague, held by Euroleague Basketball.

Multiple EuroLeague Finals Top Scorers

Top scoring performances in EuroLeague Finals games
The top scoring performances in EuroLeague Finals games:

See also
FIBA Saporta Cup Finals Top Scorer (2nd tier level)
FIBA Korać Cup Finals Top Scorer (3rd tier level)

References

External links
FIBA EuroLeague @ FIBA Europe.com
FIBA EuroLeague @ LinguaSport.com

Finals top scorers
top scorers